The canton of Saint-Omer-Nord is a former canton situated in the department of the Pas-de-Calais and in the Nord-Pas-de-Calais region of northern France. It was disbanded following the French canton reorganisation which came into effect in March 2015. It consisted of 9 communes, which joined the canton of Saint-Omer in 2015. It had a total of 15,714 inhabitants (2012).

Geography 
The canton is organised around Saint-Omer in the arrondissement of Saint-Omer. The altitude varies from 0 m (Houlle) to 166 m (Moringhem) for an average altitude of 23m.

The canton comprised 9 communes:

Clairmarais
Houlle
Moringhem
Moulle
Saint-Martin-au-Laërt
Saint-Omer (partly)
Salperwick
Serques
Tilques

See also 
Cantons of Pas-de-Calais 
Communes of Pas-de-Calais 
Arrondissements of the Pas-de-Calais department

References

Saint-Omer-Nord
Saint-Omer
2015 disestablishments in France
States and territories disestablished in 2015